Major Chester Stairs Duffus  (1 March 1891 – 23 February 1981) was a World War I flying ace credited with five aerial victories.

World War I service
Duffus joined the Royal Flying Corps in 1915, and flew Royal Aircraft Factory FE.2b pusher two-seaters for No. 22 Squadron during 1916; one of his observer gunners was fellow ace Corporal Frank Johnson. He scored five victories between 17 August and 11 December 1916. He survived a forced landing after his fourth win on 4 December, landing near Bapaume. His last triumph was shared with fellow aces Captain Selden Long and another pilot.

Duffus went on to command No. 25 Squadron.

Post World War I
Duffus married Evelyn Giles at New Market on 21 June 1919; the union would produce a daughter, born the following year.

Chester Stairs Duffus died on 23 February 1981.

Honors and awards
Military Cross (MC)

2nd Lt. Chester Stairs Duffus, R.F.C., Spec. Res.
   
For conspicuous skill and gallantry in fights with hostile aircraft. On one occasion, after hard fighting, he brought down a hostile machine in flames on our side of the line.

Sources of information

References
Above the Trenches: a Complete Record of the Fighter Aces and Units of the British Empire Air Forces 1915-1920. Christopher F. Shores, Norman L. R. Franks, Russell Guest. Grub Street, 1990. , .

1891 births
1981 deaths
Canadian World War I flying aces
People from Halifax, Nova Scotia
Royal Flying Corps officers
Recipients of the Military Cross